Tuba Dei (Latin for "God's Trumpet"), is the largest medieval bell in Poland and one of the largest medieval bells in Europe, hanging in the tower of Ss. Johns Cathedral in Toruń. It was cast in Toruń by local founder Martin Schmidt in 1500, and until the casting of Zygmunt (20 years later) it was the largest bell in Poland.

The bell weighs almost 7,500 kg (including a 200-kg clapper), has a diameter of 2.27 m, and is 2 m high.

Uppsala Cathedral 
Another bell, now called Thornan, was taken from Toruń as war booty in 1703 by Swedish forces of Carl XII during the Great Northern War. It hangs in the northern tower of Uppsala Cathedral, having replaced bells destroyed in the Uppsala Fire of 1702.

References 

Individual bells
Toruń
1500 works